Jack Kidd is a former association football player who represented New Zealand at international level.

Kidd made a solitary official international appearance for New Zealand in a 0–6 loss to Australia on 14 August 1948.

References 

Year of birth missing (living people)
Living people
New Zealand association footballers
New Zealand international footballers
Association footballers not categorized by position